Alberto Arnoldi (or di Arnoldo) was a 14th-century Italian sculptor and architect. He was born in Florence.

In 1364, he made the colossal group of the Madonna and Child with two angels (originally attributed by an error of Giorgio Vasari to Andrea Pisano) for the Loggia del Bigallo in Florence. Arnoldi worked at this group from 1359 to 1364. As architect, he directed the works of Florence Cathedral about 1358. The Museo dell'Opera del Duomo houses a marble relief from the base of the Florentine bell tower depicting the baptism attributed to Arnoldi. The date of the work is determined to be around 1375.

References

 cites:
Cicognara, Storia della scultura

External links
, by Stephan Bourgeois; Parnassus, Vol. 7, No. 3 (Mar., 1935), pp. 7–8

Sculptors from Florence
Italian male sculptors
Architects from Florence
14th-century people of the Republic of Florence
Year of birth unknown
Year of death unknown
Catholic sculptors